Mesoceras is a mid Silurian discosorid from central Europe named by Barrande in 1877, with a short, anteriorly contracted body chamber and an aperture that is a long transverse slit. (Teichert 1964). The cross section is slightly oval with the dorso-ventral dimension slightly less than the lateral. Sutures are straight and transverse, the siphuncle is subcentral.

The relationship of Mesoceras to the other discosorids is unclear (Teichert 1964) but it is most likely derived from the Mandeloceratidae (Flower and Teichert 1957, Teichert 1964), perhaps from Ovacerina

References
Flower and Teichert,1957; The Cephalopod Order Discosorida. Mollusca Article 6, University of Kansas Paleontological Contributions, July 1, 1957
Teichert,C. 1964; Nautiloidea - Discosorida, in the Treatise on Invertebrate Paleontology Part K; Geologocial Society of America and University of Kansas press, 1964.

Discosorida